Shri Haridas Shastri (1918-2013) was an Indian Gaudiya Vaisnava scholar and practitioner. A prolific Sanskrit scholar, he wrote more than a sixty books, including translations from the Sanskrit of several Gauḍīyā books and his own commentaries on them. His original works include the highly regarded book, the Vedānta-darśanam bhāgavata bhāṣyopetam, his translation-cum-commentaries of the Sat Sandarbhas, and his transliterations of Śrī-caitanya-bhāgavata, Śrī-caitanya-caritāmṛta and Śrī-caitanya-maṅgala. Jonathan Edelmann at the University of Florida has called Shastri "arguably the most prolific and well-educated Gauḍīya Vaiṣṇava “insider” scholar of the twentieth century" and "a voice distinct from the more well known Gaudīya-Maṭha and ISKCON". Among his disciples is the noted Gauḍīyā scholar and practitioner, Dr. Satyanarayana Dasa.

Early life and career 
Śrī Haridās Śāstrī was born in 1918 in Ropa, West Bengal to Śrīmatī Suśīlā Devī and Śrī Abhayacaraṇa Cattopādhyāya. His childhood name was Phaṇindra Nāth. In 1933, he journeyed to Mathura, where he lived under the care of Pandita Bābā Śrī Rāma Kṛṣṇadāsaji.

Paṇḍita Bābā chose his only veṣa disciple Śrī Vinod Vihārī Goswāmī as Phaṇindra Nāth’s teacher. Phaṇindra received mantra dīkṣā from Śrī Vinod Vihāri Goswāmi and became his disciple, with the name Haridāsa. After a year, Śrī Haridās received babaji-veṣa dīkṣā from him. He lived with
his guru and served him with great devotion. He studied the Gauḍīya Vaiṣṇava works from his guru for several years. Besides studying from his guru, he studied from other renowned scholars of Vrindavan such as Pandita Amolakrama Shastri and Dhananjaya Dasa.

Later, ordered by his guru, Śrī Haridāsa then went to Benares where he studied Indian philosophy for twelve years. He earned nine graduate degrees and three post-graduate degrees covering the six systems of Indian philosophy and theology. He studied under the top scholars of Benares, such as Vamacharan Shastri and Harerama Shastri.

His different degrees are listed in his books (for example,): Kāvya-tīrtha, Vyākaraṇa-tīrtha, Sāṅkhya-tīrtha, Mīmāṁsā-tīrtha, Vedānta-tīrtha, Vaiśeṣika-tīrtha, Navya-nyāya-śāstra, Navya-nyāyācārya, Tarka-tīrtha (pratyakṣa), Tarka-tīrtha (anumāna), Tarka-tīrtha (śabda) and Vaiṣṇava-darśana-tīrtha.

He established the Śrī Haridāsa Niwāsa āśrama at Kālīya-daha in Vṛndāvana in 1965. In the center of this āśrama was established the first major temple in Vṛndāvana to have deities of Śrī Caitanya Mahāprabhu and Śrī Gadādhara Paṇḍita.

Paramparā 
Śrī Haridās Śāstrī is part of the Gadādhara parivāra. The Gadādhara parivāra is a lineage of guru-śiṣya which originated from Śrī Gadādhara Paṇḍita. Śrī Gadādhara Paṇḍita gave dīkṣā to several disciples including Śrī Bhugarbha Goswami. Śrī Haridās Śāstrī belongs to Śrī Bhugarbha Goswami's line.

Gadādhara-Gaura Hari Press 

Śrī Haridās Śāstrī established the Gadādhara-Gaura Hari Press. His purpose was to make the works of Gaudiya Vaisnava acharyas, mainly Jiva Goswami's, which were primarily in Sanskrit, accessible to the public. He translated and published around 60 books in Sanskrit and Hindi. Many of these books contained his own commentaries. He was the first to translate and comment on Jiva Goswami’s Sat Sandarbhas in Hindi. He also established a library, Śrī Gaura-Gadādhara Granthāgāram, which is one of the largest libraries in Vrindavan today. Edelmann notes, "many academic scholars of the Gauḍīya Vaiṣṇava tradition have used Haridāsa Śāstrī published editions of the Gosvāmin’s literature".
 His Sat Sandarbhas are based on the edition of Puridas Mahashay(1895-1958).

Vedāntadarśanam 

Śrī Caitanya Mahāprabhu had explained that the Śrīmad Bhāgavatam is the natural commentary of the Vedanta-sūtras. But he had not explained how individual verses of the two scriptures related to each other. Sri Haridas Shastri addressed this key gap in the Gauḍīyā Vaiṣṇava literature, by writing and publishing his book Vedānta-darśanam. This book explains how a verse or verses of the Śrīmad Bhāgavatam comment on a specific Vedanta-sūtra. This work is exceptional in its scholarship, and was honored with an award by the Nāgarī Pracāriṇī Sabhā of Benares.

He was a great lover of cows and had a cowshed within his ashrama. He would personally take care of each cow and had a personal relationship with them. He started his cowshed around 1981 with just two cows and a bull, and by the time he left his body, the cowshed had grown to 250 cows and bulls. To ensure that the services that he started continued in his absence, he established Śrī Haridās Śāstrī Cow Institute with a board of trustees.

Bibliography

Books 

 Vedānta-darśanam bhāgavata bhāṣyopetam
 Śrī-sādhanāmṛta-candrikā
 Śrī-gaura-govindārcana-paddhati
 Śrī-rādhā-kṛṣṇārcana-dīpikā
 Śrī-govinda-līlāmṛtam (3 volumes)
 Aiśvarya-kādambinī
 Śrī-saṁkalpa-kalpa-druma
 Catuḥślokī-bhāṣyam & Śrī-kṛṣṇa-bhajanāmṛta
 Prema-sampuṭa
 Śrī-bhagavad-bhakti-sāra-samuccaya
 Braja-rīti-cintāmaṇi
 Śrī-govinda-vṛndāvanam
 Śrī-kṛṣṇa-bhakti-ratna-prakāśa
 Śrī-hari-bhakti-sāra-saṁgraha
 Dharma-saṁgraha
 Śrī-caitanya-sūkti-sudhākara
 Śrī-nāmāmṛta-samudra
 Sanat-kumāra-saṁhitā
 Śruti-stuti-vyākhyā
 Rāsa-prabandha
 Dina-candrikā
 Śrī-sādhana-dīpikā
 Svakīyātva-nirāsa-parakīyātva-nirūpaṇam
 Śrī-rādhā-rasa-sudhā-nidhi (mūla)
 Śrī-rādhā-rasa-sudhā-nidhi (sānuvād)
 Śrī-Gaurāṅga-candrodaya
 Śrī-caitanya-candrāmṛtam
 Śrī-brahma-saṁhitā
 Bhakti-candrikā
 Prameya-ratnāvalī evaṁ navaratna
 Vedānta-syamantaka
 Tattva-sandarbhaḥ
 Bhagavat-sandarbhaḥ
 Paramātma-sandarbhaḥ
 Kṛṣṇa-sandarbhaḥ
 Bhakti-sandarbhaḥ
 Prīti-sandarbhaḥ
 Daśaḥ-ślokī bhāṣyam
 Bhakti-rasāmṛta-śeṣa
 Śrī-caitanya-bhāgavata (only hindi transliteration)
 Śrī-caitanya-caritāmṛta-mahā-kāvyam
 Śrī-caitanya-maṅgala (only hindi transliteration)
 Śrī-gaurāṅga-virūdāvalī
 Śrī-kṛṣṇa-caitanya-caritāmṛta
 Sat-saṅgam
 Nitya-kṛtya-prakaraṇam
 Śrīmad-bhāgavata-prathama-śloka
 Śrī-gāyatrī-vyākhyā-vivṛtiḥ
 Śrī-hari-nāmāmṛta-vyākaraṇam
 Śrī-kṛṣṇa-janma-tithi-vidhiḥ
 Śrī-hari-bhakti-vilāsaḥ
 Kāvya-kaustubhaḥ
 Śrī-caitanya-caritāmṛta (only hindi transliteration)
 Alaṅkāra-kaustubha
 Śrī-gaurāṅga-līlāmṛtam
 Śikṣāṣṭakam
 Saṅkṣepa-śrī-hari-nāmāmṛta-vyākaraṇam
 Prayuktākhyāta manjarī
 Chando kaustubha
 Hindu-dharma-rahasyam vā sarva-dharma-samanvayaḥ
 Sāhitya-kaumudī
 Go-sevā
 Rāsalīlā
 Śrī mantra-bhāgavatam

References

External links 
http://www.sriharidasniwas.org/
http://www.sriharidasniwas.org/index.php/library-publications/publication.html

1918 births
2013 deaths
20th-century Hindu philosophers and theologians
21st-century Hindu philosophers and theologians
Gaudiya religious leaders
Indian Sanskrit scholars
Indian theologians
Indian Vaishnavites